The Annapolis Valley Regional Centre for Education (AVRCE) (formerly Annapolis Valley Regional School Board) is the public school district responsible for the approximately 40 elementary, middle level, and high schools in Annapolis County, Kings County, and the West Hants Municipal District of Hants County in Nova Scotia, Canada.  The school district was renamed following the dissolution of elected school boards and placing  in Nova Scotia in March 2018.

Schools

Annapolis County
Annapolis East Elementary School (pr to 5); 325 Marshall Street, Middleton
Annapolis West Education Centre (6 to 12); 100 Champlain Drive, Annapolis Royal
Bridgetown Regional Community School (pr to 12); 25 Cromwell Court, Bridgetown
Champlain Elementary School (pr to 5); 109 North Street, Granville
Clark Rutherford Memorial School (pr to 5); 63 Spinnaker Drive, Cornwallis
Lawrencetown Consolidated School (pr to 5); 10 Middle Road, Lawrencetown
Middleton Regional High School (6 to 12); 18 Gates Avenue, Middleton

Kings County
Aldershot Elementary School (pr to 5); 446 Aldershot Road, Kentville
Berwick & District School (pr to 8); 220 Veterans Drive, Berwick
Cambridge & District Elementary School (pr to 5); 6113 Trunk 1, Cambridge Station
Central Kings Rural High School (6 to 12); Cambridge Station
Coldbrook & District School (pr to 8); 2305 English Mountain Road, Coldbrook
Dwight Ross Elementary School (pr to 5); Greenwood
Evangeline Middle School (6 to 8); New Minas
Gaspareau Valley Elementary School (pr to 5); 2459 Greenfield Road, Wolfville
Glooscap Elementary School (pr to 5); 1017 J. Jordan Road, Canning
Hantsport School (pr to 8); 11 School Street, Hantsport
Highbury Education Centre (10 and 11); 1042 Highbury Road, New Minas
Horton High School (9 to 12); 75 Greenwich Road South, Wolfville
Kings County Academy (pr to 8); 35 Gary Pearl Drive, Kentville
Kingston District School (pr to 5); 630 Pine Ridge Avenue, Kingston
L.E. Shaw Elementary School (pr to 5); 486 Oak Island Road, Avonport
New Minas Elementary School (pr to 5); 34 Jones Road, New Minas
Northeast Kings Education Centre (6 to 12); 1816 Bains Road, Canning
Pine Ridge Middle School (6 to 8); 625 Pine Ridge Avenue, Kingston
Port Williams Elementary School (pr to 5); 1261 Belcher Street, Port Williams
Somerset & District Elementary School (pr to 5); 4339 Brooklyn Street, Berwick
St. Mary's Elementary School (pr to 5); 1276 Victoria Road, Aylesford
West Kings District High School (9 to 12); 1941 Trunk 1, Auburn
Wolfville School (pr to 8); 19 Acadia Street, Wolfville

West Hants Municipality
Avon View High School (9 to 12); 225 Payzant Drive, Windsor
Brooklyn District Elementary School (pr to 5); 8008 Trunk 14, Newport
Dr. Arthur Hines Elementary School (pr to 5); 75 Musgrave Road, Summerville
Falmouth District Elementary School (pr to 5); 30 School Road, Falmouth
Three Mile Plains School (pr to 5); 4555 Trunk 1, Curry's Corner
West Hants Middle School (6 to 8); 8009 Trunk 14, Newport
Windsor Elementary School (pr to 5); 100 Tremaine Crescent, Windsor
Windsor Forks District Elementary School (pr to 5); 120 Sangster Bridge Road, Curry's Corner

Recent School Development and Closures 
In 1999, Horton High School was built.
In 2000, Champlain Elementary School was built.
In 2001, Northeast Kings Education Centre was built as a result of the Kings County Academy High School, in Kentville and Cornwallis District High School, in Canning amalgamating.
In 2001, Pine Ridge Middle School was built.
In 2003, Avon View High School was built as a result of Hants West Rural High School in Newport and Windsor Regional High School in Windsor amalgamating.
In 2004, Springfield Consolidated School, which housed students grades primary to 6, closed, students were moved to either Annapolis East Elementary School or New Germany Elementary School in the South Shore Regional School Board.
In 2004, Margaretville Consolidated School. which housed students grades primary to 6, closed, students were moved to Annapolis East Elementary School.  
In 2011, Kings County Academy was built.
In 2015, Annapolis Royal Regional Academy, which housed students grades 6 to 8, closed, students were moved to nearby high school Annapolis West Education Centre.
In 2015, Newport Station District School, which housed students grades primary to 6, closed with only 67 students enrolling, students were moved to either Brooklyn District Elementary School or Three Mile Plains District School.
In 2017, The grade primary to 12 Bridgetown Regional Community School was built as a result of Bridgetown Regional Elementary School and Bridgetown Regional High School amalgamating.

Feeder System

See also
List of Nova Scotia schools
Education in Canada

References

External links
Annapolis Valley Regional School Board

School districts in Nova Scotia
Education in Annapolis County, Nova Scotia
Education in Hants County, Nova Scotia
Education in Kings County, Nova Scotia